In the New Zealand judicial system a cultural report is a document supplied to the court in order to establish a cultural context for a defendant's actions and to aide in their rehabilitation. In New Zealand law, they are allowed under section 27 of the Sentencing Act 2002, and so are also called S27 reports. Although cultural reports are not required, they have become increasingly common since 2019, and are frequently submitted by defendants in order to receive lighter sentencing. 

The cost of cultural reports has been the subject of criticism, as the amount billed to legal aid or the Public Defence Service for cultural reports increased from $639,311 in 2019 to $3.3 million in 2020, and reached $5.91 million for the period between July 2021 and June 2022. The additional value of the reports has also been called into question, as critics like independent justice advocate Ruth Money suggest that pre-sentence reports provided by the probation services of Department of Corrections already provide background on defendants. Harry Tam, a Mongrel Mob member and consultant who provides cultural reports says that distinct from the pre-sentencing reports, S27 reports are "predominantly focused on looking at the disadvantages that may have contributed to the person’s offending behaviour and options to address it".

In 2018 the Ministry of Justice ceased funding for cultural reports, shifting that responsibility to legal aid.

References 

Law of New Zealand